This is a list of recordings by American jazz alto saxophonist Charlie Parker. Parker primarily recorded for three labels: Savoy, Dial, and Verve.   His work with these labels has been chronicled in box sets. Charlie Parker's Savoy and Dial Sessions have been issued on The Complete Savoy Sessions, Charlie Parker on Dial and Complete Charlie Parker on Dial and The Complete Savoy & Dial Master Takes.  His Verve recordings are available on  Bird: The Complete Charlie Parker on Verve and The Complete Verve Master Takes.

The listing below is in the form of a sessionography, as opposed to a discography. Although organized chronologically, the release titles listed refer to compilations of Parker material appearing decades after the recording sessions.  In general they do not refer to records in the formats actually issued during Parker's lifetime, so with a few exceptions technically they should all come under the heading of compilations. For instance, no record label in 1944 would have issued an album of 78s entitled The Immortal Charlie Parker to describe a relatively unknown jazz musician at that time, and in 1948 there would never have been a record entitled Newly Discovered Sides by Charlie Parker as if Charlie Parker were an unearthed archeological artifact - anything by Bird in 1948 would have been fairly new. It is also worth noting that a significant proportion of the listings outside of the live list are in fact live recordings.

Albums

Savoy
1944
The Immortal Charlie Parker
Bird: Master Takes
Encores
1945
Dizzy Gillespie - Groovin' High
The Genius of Charlie Parker
The Charlie Parker Story
Charlie Parker Memorial, Vol. 2
1947
Charlie Parker Memorial, Vol. 1
1948
Bird at the Roost, Vol. 1
Newly Discovered Sides by Charlie Parker
The 'Bird' Returns
1949
Bird at the Roost, Vol. 2
Bird at the Roost
1950
An Evening at Home with Charlie Parker Sextet

Dial
1945
Red Norvo's Fabulous Jam Session
1946
Alternate Masters, Vol. 2
1947
The Bird Blows the Blues
Cool Blues c/w Bird's Nest
Alternate Masters, Vol. 1
Crazeology c/w Crazeology, II: 3 Ways of Playing a Chorus
Charlie Parker, Vol. 4

Verve
1946
Jazz at the Philharmonic, Vol. 2
Jazz at the Philharmonic, Vol. 4
1948
Various Artists - Potpourri of Jazz
The Charlie Parker Story, #1
1949
The Genius of Charlie Parker, #7 - Jazz Perennial
Jazz at the Philharmonic, Vol. 7
Jazz at the Philharmonic - The Ella Fitzgerald Set
The Complete Charlie Parker on Verve - Bird
1950
The Genius of Charlie Parker, #4 - Bird and Diz (released on Verve's subsidiary label Clef)
The Charlie Parker Story, #3
1951
The Genius of Charlie Parker, #8 - Swedish Schnapps
The Genius of Charlie Parker, #6 - Fiesta
1952
The Genius of Charlie Parker, #3 - Now's the Time
1953
The Quartet of Charlie Parker
1954
The Genius of Charlie Parker, #5 - Charlie Parker Plays Cole Porter (released posthumously)
1957
The Genius of Charlie Parker, #1 - Night and Day - Verve MGV-8003- mono (released posthumously)

Compilations
1940
Bird's Eyes, Vol. 1 (Philology)
Charlie Parker with Jay McShann and His Orchestra - Early Bird (Stash)
Jay McShann Orchestra featuring Charlie Parker - Early Bird (Spotlight)
1941
Jay McShann - The Early Bird Charlie Parker, 1941-1943: Jazz Heritage Series (MCA)
The Complete Birth of the Bebop (Stash)
1943
Birth of the Bebop: Bird on Tenor 1943 (Stash)
1945
Every Bit of It 1945 (Spotlight)
Charlie Parker, Vol. 3 Young Bird 1945 (Masters of Jazz)
Dizzy Gillespie - In the Beginning (Prestige)
Bird's Eyes, Vol. 17 (Philology)
Charlie Parker on Dial, Vol. 5 (Spotlight)
Red Norvo's Fabulous Jam Session (Spotlight)
Dizzy Gillespie/Charlie Parker - Town Hall, New York City, June 22, 1945 (Uptown Records)
Bird's Eyes, Vol. 4 (Philology)
Yardbird in Lotus Land (Spotlight)
1946
Rappin' with Bird (Meexa)
Jazz at the Philharmonic - How High the Moon (Mercury)
Charlie Parker on Dial, Vol. 1 (Spotlight)
1947
The Legendary Dial Masters, Vol. 2 (Stash)
Various Artists - Lullaby in Rhythm (Spotlight)
Charlie Parker on Dial, Vol. 2 (Spotlight)
Charlie Parker on Dial, Vol. 3 (Spotlight)
Charlie Parker on Dial, Vol. 4 (Spotlight)
Various Artists - Anthropology (Spotlight)
Allen Eager - In the Land of Oo-Bla-Dee 1947-1953  (Uptown)
Charlie Parker on Dial, Vol. 6 (Spotlight)
Various Artists - The Jazz Scene (Clef)
1948
Gene Roland Band featuring Charlie Parker - The Band That Never Was (Spotlight)
Bird's Eyes, Vol. 6 (Philology)
Bird on 52nd St. (Jazz Workshop)
Charlie Parker (Prestige)
Charlie Parker - Live Performances (ESP)
Charlie Parker on the Air, Vol. 1 (Everest)
1949
Charlie Parker - Broadcast Performances, Vol. 2 (ESP)
The Metronome All Stars - From Swing to Be-Bop (RCA Camden)
Jazz at the Philharmonic - J.A.T.P. at Carnegie Hall 1949 (Pablo)
Rara Avis Avis, Rare Bird (Stash)
Various Artists - Alto Saxes (Norgran)
Bird on the Road (Jazz Showcase)
Charlie Parker/Dizzy Gillespie - Bird and Diz (Universal (Japan))
Charlie Parker - Bird in Paris (Bird in Paris)
Charlie Parker in France 1949 (Jazz O.P. (France))
Charlie Parker - Bird Box, Vol. 2 (Jazz Up (Italy))
Bird's Eyes, Vol. 5 (Philology)
Charlie Parker with Strings (Clef)
Bird's Eyes, Vol. 2 (Philology)
Bird's Eyes, Vol. 3 (Philology)
Dance of the Infidels (S.C.A.M.)
1950 
Charlie Parker Live Birdland 1950  (EPM Musique (F) FDC 5710)
Charlie Parker - Bird at St. Nick's  (Jazz Workshop JWS 500)
Charlie Parker at the Apollo Theater and St. Nick's Arena  (Zim ZM 1007)
Charlie Parker - Bird's Eyes, Vol. 15  (Philology (It) W 845-2)
Charlie Parker - Fats Navarro - Bud Powell  (Ozone 4)
Charlie Parker - One Night in Birdland  (Columbia JG 34808)
Charlie Parker - Bud Powell - Fats Navarro  (Ozone 9)
Charlie Parker - Just Friends  (S.C.A.M. JPG 4)
Charlie Parker - Apartment Jam Sessions  (Zim ZM 1006)
V.A. - Our Best  (Clef MGC 639)
The Genius of Charlie Parker, #4 - Bird and Diz  (Verve MGV 8006)
The Persuasively Coherent Miles Davis  (Alto AL 701)
Charlie Parker - Ultimate Bird 1949-50  (Grotto 495)
Charlie Parker - Ballads and Birdland  (Klacto (E) MG 101)
Charlie Parker Big Band  (Mercury MGC 609)
Charlie Parker - Parker Plus Strings  (Charlie Parker PLP 513)
Charlie Parker - Bird with Strings Live at the Apollo, Carnegie Hall and Birdland  (Columbia JC 34832)
Charlie Parker - The Bird You Never Heard  (Stash STCD 10)
Norman Granz Jazz Concert  (Norgran MGN 3501-2)
Charlie Parker at the Pershing Ballroom Chicago 1950  (Zim ZM 1003)
The Charlie Parker Story, #3  (Verve MGV 8002)
Charlie Parker - Bird in Sweden  (Spotlite (E) SPJ 124/25)
Charlie Parker - More Unissued, Vol. 2  (Royal Jazz (D) RJD 506)
Machito - Afro-Cuban Jazz  (Clef MGC 689)
An Evening at Home with Charlie Parker Sextet  (Savoy MG 12152)
1951 
The Genius of Charlie Parker, #8 - Swedish Schnapps  (Verve MGV 8010)
The Magnificent Charlie Parker  (Clef MGC 646)
The Genius of Charlie Parker, #6 - Fiesta  (Verve MGV 8008)
Charlie Parker - Summit Meeting at Birdland  (Columbia JC 34831)
Charlie Parker - Bird Meets Birks  (Klacto (E) MG 102)
Charlie Parker - The Happy "Bird"  (Charlie Parker PLP 404)
Charlie Parker Live Boston, Philadelphia, Brooklyn 1951  (EPM Musique (F) FDC 5711)
Charlie Parker - Bird with the Herd 1951  (Alamac QSR 2442)
Charlie Parker - More Unissued, Vol. 1  (Royal Jazz (D) RJD 505)
1952
Charlie Parker - New Bird, Vol. 2  (Phoenix LP 12)
Charlie Parker/Sonny Criss/Chet Baker - Inglewood Jam 6-16-'52  (Jazz Chronicles JCS 102)
Norman Granz' Jam Session, #1  (Clef MGC 601)
Norman Granz' Jam Session, #2  (Clef MGC 602)
Charlie Parker Live at Rockland Palace  (Charlie Parker PLP 502)
Charlie Parker - Cheers  (S.C.A.M. JPG 2)
The Genius of Charlie Parker, #3 - Now's the Time  (Verve MGV 8005)
1953
Miles Davis - Collectors' Items  (Prestige PRLP 7044, released posthumously in 1956)
Charlie Parker - Montreal 1953  (Uptown UP 27.36)
Charlie Parker/Miles Davis/Dizzy Gillespie - Bird with Miles and Dizzy  (Queen Disc (It) Q-002)
Charlie Parker - One Night in Washington  (Elektra/Musician E1 60019)
Charlie Parker - Yardbird-DC-53  (VGM 0009)
Charlie Parker at Storyville  (Blue Note BT 85108)
Charlie Parker - Star Eyes  (Klacto (E) MG 100)
Charles Mingus - The Complete Debut Recordings  (Debut 12DCD 4402-2)
The Quintet - Jazz at Massey Hall, Vol. 1  (Debut DLP 2)
The Quintet - Jazz at Massey Hall  (Debut DEB 124)
Charlie Parker - Bird Meets Birks  (Mark Gardner (E) MG 102)
Bud Powell - Summer Broadcasts 1953  (ESP-Disk' ESP 3023)
Charlie Parker - New Bird: Hi Hat Broadcasts 1953  (Phoenix LP 10)
The Quartet of Charlie Parker  (Verve 825 671-2)
1954
Hi-Hat All Stars, Guest Artists, Charlie Parker  (Fresh Sound (Sp) FSR 303)
Charlie Parker - Kenton and Bird  (Jazz Supreme JS 703)
The Genius of Charlie Parker, #5 - Charlie Parker Plays Cole Porter  (Verve MGV 8007)
Charlie Parker - Miles Davis - Lee Konitz  (Ozone 2)
V.A. - Echoes of an Era: The Birdland All Stars Live at Carnegie Hall  (Roulette RE 127)
1969
Bird 'n' Diz the Beginning (Roulette, SK-106/K-106)

Live albums
Live at Townhall w. Dizzy (1945)
Yardbird in Lotus Land (1945)
Bird and Pres (1946) (Verve)
Jazz at the Philharmonic (1946) (Polygram)
Rapping with Bird (1946-1951)
Diz 'N Bird at Carnegie Hall (1947) (Blue Note)
The Complete Savoy Live Performances (1947–1950)
Bird on 52nd Street (1948) (Jazz Workshop)
The Complete Dean Benedetti Recordings (1948–1951) (7 cds)
Jazz at the Philharmonic (1949) (Verve)
Charlie Parker and the Stars of Modern Jazz at Carnegie Hall (1949) (Jass)
Bird in Paris (1949)
Bird in France (1949)
Charlie Parker All Stars Live at the Royal Roost (1949)
One Night in Birdland (1950) (Columbia)
Bird at St. Nick's (1950) (Jazz Workshop)
Bird at the Apollo Theatre and St. Nicklas Arena (1950)
Apartment Jam Sessions (1950)
Charlie Parker at the Pershing Ballroom Chicago 1950 (1950)
Bird in Sweden (1950) (Storyville)
Happy Bird (1951)
Summit Meeting at Birdland (1951) (Columbia)
Live at Rockland Palace (1952)
Boston - 1952 (1952) (Uptown Records)
Jam Session (1952) (Polygram)
At Jirayr Zorthian's Ranch, July 14, 1952 (1952) (Rare Live Recordings)
The Complete Legendary Rockland Palace Concert (1952)
Charlie Parker: Montreal 1953 (1953)
One Night in Washington (1953) (VGM)
Bird at the High Hat (1953) (Blue Note)
Charlie Parker at Storyville (1953)
Jazz at Massey Hall  aka The Greatest Jazz Concert Ever (1953)

As sideman
With Dizzy Gillespie
The Complete RCA Victor Recordings (Bluebird, 1937-1949 [1995])

Incomplete list of compositions

The following is an incomplete list of compositions written by Charlie Parker:
"Ah-Leu-Cha"
"Air Conditioning (Drifting On A Reed)"
"Another Hairdo"
"Anthropology" (AKA "Thriving from a Riff")
"Au Privave"
"An Oscar for Treadwell"
"Back Home Blues"
"Ballade"
"Barbados"
"Billie's Bounce"
"Bird Feathers"
"Bird Gets the Worm"
"Bird of Paradise"
"Bloomdido"
"Blue Bird"
"Blues (Fast)"
"Blues for Alice"
"Buzzy"
"Card Board"
"Celebrity"
"Chasing the Bird"
"Cheryl"
"Chi Chi"
"Confirmation"
"Constellation"
"Cool Blues"
"Cosmic Rays"
"Dewey Square"
"Dexterity"
"Diverse"
"Donna Lee" (Miles Davis also claimed authorship)
"Kim"
"K.C. Blues"
"Klaun Stance"
"Ko-Ko"
"Laird Baird"
"Leap Frog"
"Marmaduke"
"Merry-Go-Round"
"Moose the Mooche"
"Mohawk"
"My Little Suede Shoes"
"Now’s the Time"
"Ornithology"
"Parker's Mood"
"Passport"
"Perhaps"
"Quasimodo"
"Red Cross"
"Relaxin' at Camarillo"
"Relaxing with Lee"
"Scrapple from the Apple"
"Segment"
"Shawnuff" (with Dizzy Gillespie)
"She Rote"
"Si Si"
"Steeplechase"
"The Bird"
"Visa"
"Warming Up a Riff"
"Yardbird Suite"

External links
 Charlie Parker CD Discography
  Charlie Parker - JazzDiscography Project
 Discogs

Jazz discographies
Discography
Discographies of American artists